Reid's Grove School is a historic Rosenwald school located near Gatesville, Gates County, North Carolina. It was built in 1927, and is a one-story, side-gable frame school with a prominent projecting single-bay gabled
wing.  It was one of seven schools in the county financed and constructed with the assistance of the Rosenwald Fund for the education of African-American children. It replaced an earlier school built in the 1880s.  The building ceased its function as a school in 1951.

It was listed on the National Register of Historic Places in 2011.

References

African-American history of North Carolina
Rosenwald schools in North Carolina
School buildings on the National Register of Historic Places in North Carolina
School buildings completed in 1927
Buildings and structures in Gates County, North Carolina
National Register of Historic Places in Gates County, North Carolina
1927 establishments in North Carolina